260 (two hundred [and] sixty) is the natural number following 259 and preceding 261.

It is also the magic constant of the n×n normal magic square and n-queens problem for n = 8, the size of an actual chess board.

260 is also the magic constant of the Franklin magic square devised by Benjamin Franklin.

The minor diagonal gives 260, and in addition a number of combinations of two half diagonals of four numbers from a corner to the center give 260.

There are 260 days in the Mayan sacred calendar Tzolkin.

260 may also refer to the years AD 260 and 260 BC.

Integers from 261 to 269

261

261 = 32·29, lucky number, nonagonal number, unique period in base 2, number of possible unfolded tesseract patterns.

262

262 = 2·131, meandric number, open meandric number, untouchable number, happy number, palindrome number, semiprime.

263

263 is a prime, safe prime, happy number, sum of five consecutive primes (43 + 47 + 53 + 59 + 61), balanced prime, Chen prime, Eisenstein prime with no imaginary part, strictly non-palindromic number, Bernoulli irregular prime, Euler irregular prime, Gaussian prime, full reptend prime, Solinas prime, Ramanujan prime.

264
264 = 23·3·11 = number of edges in a 11·11 square grid. The sum of all 2-digit numbers from 264, is 264: 24 + 42 + 26 + 62 + 46 + 64 = 264. 132 and 396 share this property.

264 equals the sum of the squares of the digits of its own square in base 15. This property is shared with 1, 159, 284, 306 and 387.

265
265 = 5·53, semiprime, Padovan number, number of derangements of 6 elements, centered square number, Smith number, subfactorial 6.

266
266 = 2·7·19 = , sphenic number, nontotient, noncototient, repdigit in base 11 (222). 266 is also the index of the largest proper subgroups of the sporadic group known as the Janko group J1.

267
267 = 3·89, semiprime, the number of groups of order 64. 267 is the smallest number n such that n plus a googol is prime.

268
268 = 22·67, noncototient, untouchable number. 268 is the smallest number whose product of digits is 6 times the sum of its digits.

269

269 is a prime, twin prime with 271, sum of three consecutive primes (83 + 89 + 97), Chen prime, Eisenstein prime with no imaginary part, highly cototient number, strictly non-palindromic number, full reptend prime

References

Integers